The American Institute of Constructors (AIC), is a not-for-profit 501(c)(6) non-governmental professional association founded in 1971. Individuals involved in the AIC are typically found in the construction management Industry.

The AIC offers three different levels of certification: Associate Constructor (AC), Certified Professional Constructor (CPC), and Fellow (FC). American Institute of Constructors also offers a number of educational programs, including online courses, webinars, and in-person seminars.

References

External links
 

Construction organizations
Construction management